Sir John Croft, 4th Baronet, was the son of Sir Archer Croft, 2nd Baronet and Frances Waring. He died at Bath, Somerset on 4 December 1797, without legitimate issue.

Baronetage 
He succeeded to the title of 4th Baronet Croft, of Croft Castle, County Hereford on 30 November 1790 upon the death of his brother, Sir Archer Croft, 3rd Baronet Croft, who had died without male issue.

References

External links

1797 deaths
Baronets in the Baronetage of England
Year of birth missing